St John the Baptist's Church, Kirby Wiske is a Grade II* listed parish church in the Church of England in Kirby Wiske, North Yorkshire.

History

The church dates from the twelfth century with 14th and 15th century additions.

Parish status
The church is in a joint parish with
St Helen's Church, Ainderby Steeple
St Andrew's Church, Great Fencote
St Wilfrid's Church, Great Langton
St Mary's Church, Kirkby Fleetham
St Radegund's Church, Scruton
All Saints' Church, Yafforth

Organ

A pipe organ was built in 1883 at a cost of £400 by Isaac Abbott of Leeds.  A specification of the organ can be found on the National Pipe Organ Register.

References

Kirby Wiske
Kirby Wiske